Lawn bowls at the 2001 Southeast Asian Games took place in the Bukit Kiara Sports Complex in Kuala Lumpur, Malaysia from 8 to 17 September 2001.

Medal table

Medalists

Men

Women

References

2001 Southeast Asian Games events